Eleonore Henriette Magdalena Grabau-Bünau, also Henriette Grabau or Henriette Bünau, (29 March 1805 – 28 November 1852) was a German operatic alto and mezzo-soprano. For twelve years she was the main singer at the Leipzig Gewandhaus and from 1843 to 1849 she was the first teacher at the Leipzig Conservatory.

Life

Childhood and education in Bremen and Dresden 
Born in Bremen, Grabau was the daughter of the teacher and organist of the Church of Our Lady, Bremen and St. Remberti in Bremen  and of Margarethe Anna Adelheid Arensberg. His father founded the Grabau'schen Singverein in 1811. Grabau grew up with five siblings and received her first voice and piano lessons from her father and from the Bremen music director Wilhelm Friedrich Riem. her brother Georg Christian (1806-1854) was organist in Verden, her brother Andreas (1808-1885) a famous cellist in Leipzig and from 1843 teacher at the local conservatory. Her sister Adelheid (1807-1854) was a concert singer in Bremen and Leipzig, also her sister Maria (1812-after 1849) became a concert singer. Her brother  (1810-1874) became a painter.

Several concerts by Henriette Grabau in Bremen in the 1820s, often in the ballroom of the Kramer-Amtshaus, are documented. From 1824, she studied singing in Dresden with the Bohemian singer and singing teacher Johann Aloys Miksch. In 1827, she appeared together with her sister Adelheid at the Theater Bremen, but also gave several concerts together with her in Leipzig in the 1830s.

Leipzig  
In spring 1826, through Miksch's mediation, she successfully performed a subscription concert with an aria by Rossini in the Leipzig Gewandhaus. Thereupon, she engaged the Concert-Direction for twelve years as the main singer in the Gewandhaus. Her sister Adelheid also performed here at that time. In 1835 Felix Mendelssohn Bartholdy was appointed Kapellmeister in Leipzig, who promoted her and used her for concerts in the Gewandhaus until 1837. She also sang in the first public concert of Clara Wieck at the Gewandhaus on 20 October 1828, and frequently appeared with her in the subscription concerts of the Leipzig Gewandhaus in the early 1830s. 

In 1836 she was the soloist of the first performance of Mendelssohn-Bartholdy's Paulus in Düsseldorf. He engaged her repeatedly for the Niederrheinisches Musikfest. In 1836 she sang for the role of Vitellia in Titus by Mozart. In 1837, she sang in a concert of the piano virtuoso Adolf Henselt at the invitation of Robert Schumann in Leipzig. She was friends with Henselt and with him at Davidsbündler (under the name of "Maria"), a circle of young artists founded by Schumann in the Leipzig pub "". From 1839 to 1852, she and Schumann had a lively correspondence. 

Mendelssohn enthused on 30 October 1835: "She is one of the few genuine musical singers I have met, she could conduct the orchestra on the side, or play the piano or harp if she wanted to ... if she just wanted to be pretty and younger! One could fall in love over the ears." One day later, Mendelssohn wrote to the painter Eduard Hildebrandt: "[...] I have seldom heard such perfection from a German singer, and the sons of Düsseldorf's muses would rave if they could hear this golden lecture. [...]“

In 1843, the Leipzig Conservatory was founded, a predecessor institution of today's University of Music and Theatre Leipzig. Grabau, the violin virtuoso Ferdinand David, the violinist and music theorist Moritz Hauptmann, the organist and music writer Carl Ferdinand Becker and Robert Schumann taught there; Grabau was the first and at that time only teacher of choral and solo singing until 1849.

In 1837, she married the merchant Julius Alexander Bünau (1809-1871); in 1838 her daughter Helene (d. 1893) was born. Henriette Grabau-Bünau also took part in the commemoration of Mendelssohn's death on 4 November 1847.

Grabau died in Leipzig aged 47.

Music log book 
In Henriette Grabaud's music family register (1836-1852) there is a copy of Mendelssohn's Songs without Words and an excerpt from the opera Ali Baba by Luigi Cherubini, notated by Mendelssohn. This album also contains Mendelssohn's watercolour of the Leipzig Gewandhaus and autographs of Franz Liszt, Maria Malibran, Robert Schumann and Clara Schumann as well as Friedrich Rochlitz (Numerized, Helene Bünau legacy, Gertrude Clarke Whittall Foundation Collection of the Library of Congress)

Further reading 
 Alfred Dörffel: Festschrift zur hundertjährigen Jubelfeier der Einweihung des Concertsaales im Gewandhause zu Leipzig, Leipzig 1884. (Numerized)
 Wilhelm Albert Grabau: Die Geschichte der Familie Grabau, 2 volumes, Leipzig: Sturm & Koppe 1929 and 1932/33.
 Emil Kneschke: Die Hundertundfünfzigjährige Geschichte der Leipziger Gewandhaus-Concerte 1843–1893. Leipzig 1893.
 : Grabau-Bünau, Eleonore Henriette, geb. Grabau. In Frauen Geschichte(n), Bremer Frauenmuseum (ed.). Edition Falkenberg, Bremen 2016, .
 Brigitte Richter: Frauen um Felix Mendelssohn Bartholdy, Leipzig 2014, .
 Henrike Rost: Musik-Stammbücher: Erinnerung, Unterhaltung und Kommunikation im Europa des 19. Jahrhunderts (Musik – Kultur – Gender 17), Cologne among others 2020.
Schumann-Briefedition, Serie II, vol. 20: Briefwechsel mit Freunden und Künstlerkollegen (Briefwechsel Robert und Clara Schumanns mit Korrespondenten in Leipzig 1830 bis 1894), Editionsleitung: Thomas Synofzik and Michael Heinemann; Publisher: Annegret Rosenmüller and Ekaterina Smyka, Cologne 2019, .

References

External links 
 
 Doris Mundus: Artikel „Grabau-Bünau, Henriette Eleonore“. Leipziger Frauenporträts auf der Webseite der Stadt Leipzig 2015

German operatic mezzo-sopranos
1805 births
1852 deaths
Musicians from Bremen